Why The Sun and the Moon Live in the Sky is a children's picture book written by Elphinstone Dayrell and illustrated by Blair Lent retelling an African folk tale about the origin of the world and its natural elements. The book was published by Houghton Mifflin Company in 1968.

In 1969 it received the Caldecott Honor for Lent's illustrations. It has been cited as an example of a pourquoi story for young readers.

References

1968 children's books
American picture books
African folklore
Caldecott Honor-winning works